Colin Harris may refer to:

 Colin Harris (footballer) (born 1961), Scottish former footballer
 Colin Harris (hurler), hurler from County Kerry, Ireland
Colin "Bomber" Harris vs Colin "Bomber" Harris, a Monty Python comedy sketch